Vermont School is a private school in Mexico City. It has two campuses: Plantel Pedregal in Jardines del Pedregal, Álvaro Obregón, which has preschool and primary school; and Plantel San Jerónimo, in San Jerónimo, Magdalena Contreras, serving middle school (secundaria) and senior high school (preparatoria).

History
Previously its divisions were Vermy Bear, Vermont School, and Vermont Institute (Instituto Vermont, S.C.), with the first and last campuses in Jardines del Pedregal and Vermont School in San Jerónimo. Vermont Institute opened in 1998.

References

External links
 Vermont School 

High schools in Mexico City
Educational institutions established in 1998
1998 establishments in Mexico